Cordovan may refer to:

 Shell cordovan, a type of leather
 Cordovan (color), a shade of red-brown

See also
 El Cordobés (The Cordovan), a matador of the 1960s